Events from the year 1835 in Canada.

Incumbents
Monarch: William IV

Federal government
Parliament of Lower Canada: 15th (starting March 21)
Parliament of Upper Canada: 12th (starting January 15)

Governors
Governor of the Canadas: Robert Milnes
Governor of New Brunswick: George Stracey Smyth
Governor of Nova Scotia: John Coape Sherbrooke
Commodore-Governor of Newfoundland: Richard Goodwin Keats
Governor of Prince Edward Island: Charles Douglass Smith

Events
February 21 – The Governor's speech, proroguing the Assembly's last session, is expunged from the Journals. The revolutionary speech reduces the Country Party in the House to less than two-thirds of the members. The Governor will not sign a warrant for sessional expenses, until past payments are ratified. He prorogues the House.
June 1 – Official opening of the Kingston Penitentiary.

Full date unknown
Joseph Howe, a Halifax printer and owner since 1828 of the weekly Novascotian, is arrested for libel but successfully argues his own case for freedom of the press. A local hero, he begins advocating the kind of responsible government that is only established in 1848.
In the British Parliament, Mr. Stanley says there is no evidence to justify any one of the 92 Resolutions.
Sir Robert Peel announces that a Commission will investigate Canadian affairs, and report; but that no change of Constitution will be immediately made. If complaints as to its working prove unfounded, the agitation will be suppressed. To those threatening insurrection, he says "Our desire is to do justice; beware, then, lest your threats turn to your own disadvantage.

Births
March 22 – Pierre Bachand, politician (died 1878)
June – Richard Alleyn, lawyer, judge, educator and politician (died 1883)
June 27 – Daniel Lionel Hanington, politician and 5th Premier of New Brunswick (died 1909)
June 28 – Adélard-Joseph Boucher, politician
September 20 – Alfred Boyd, politician and 1st Premier of Manitoba (died 1908)
November 5 – Edgar Dewdney, politician, Lieutenant Governor of Northwest Territories and Lieutenant Governor of British Columbia (died 1916)
December 4 – Richard John Cartwright, businessman, politician and Minister (died 1912)

Deaths

References 

 
Canada
Years of the 19th century in Canada
1835 in North America